Fayuan Zhulin ("Forest of Gems in the Garden of the Dharma"), in 100 juan (卷 "volume", "fascicle"), is a Buddhist encyclopedia compiled AD 668 by Daoshi (道世). It comprises Buddhist and other ancient texts otherwise lost, and is thus an important source for the study of medieval Chinese Buddhism.
It was used under the Ming Dynasty to reconstruct older zhiguai collections.

References

Further reading

Ong Hsu, Alexander (2018). Practices of Scriptural Economy: Compiling and Copying a Seventh-Century Chinese Buddhist Anthology, dissertation, University of Chicago
Teiser, S. F. (1985). T'ang Buddhist Encyclopedias:an Introduction to Fa-Yüan Chu-Lin and Chu-Ching Yao-Chi, Tang Studies, 1985:3, 109–128, DOI: 10.1179/tng.1985.1985.3.109

External links
Fayuan Zhulin CBETA (Chinese)

Chinese encyclopedias
Mahayana texts
Tang dynasty literature
Buddhist encyclopedias
7th-century Chinese books